Fanny Valette (born 4 July 1986) is a French actress. 

In January 2011 she parodied herself in the video to Max Boublil's comic song J'aime les moches ("I like ugly girls").

Life and career 
Valette started her career in an episode of L'instit.  In 2005, she was critically praised for her role in Little Jerusalem, for which she won the Lumières Award for Most Promising Actress.

Filmography

Film
 1999 : Le fils du Français, by Gérard Lauzier
 2005 : La Petite Jérusalem, by Karin Albou
 2006 : Changement d'adresse, by Emmanuel Mouret
 2007 : Molière, by Laurent Tirard
 2008 : Sur ta joue ennemie, by Jean-Xavier de Lestrade
 2009 : La Loi de Murphy, by Christophe Campos
 2009 : Vertige, by Abel Ferry high lane 
 2010 : Je ne vous oublierai jamais, by Pascal Kané
 2015 : Night Fare, by Julien Seri
 2017 : Mr. Stein Goes Online, by Stéphane Robelin

Television
 1995 : Une famille pour deux
 1996 : L'instit (Demain dès l'aube)
 1997 : La Famille Sapajou
 1997 : Les Filles du maître de chai
 1998 : Les Rives du paradis
 1998 : Un mois de réflexion
 1998 : Tous les papas ne font pas pipi debout
 2002 : Justice de femme
 2003 : Marylin et ses enfants
 2006 : L'Avare
 2009 : Une aventure New-Yorkaise
 2010 : Le Pas Petit Poucet
 2010 : Sable noir (In memoriam)
 2011 : L'Épervier
 2012 : La main passe, by Thierry Petit
 2014 : Engrenages (UK: Spiral)

Awards and nominations
 2006: Lumières Award for Most Promising Actress
 2006: César Awards, nominated for Most Promising Actress (Meilleur jeune espoir féminin)
 2006: Étoiles d'Or, won for Best Female Newcomer (La révélation féminine)

References

External links

1986 births
Living people
People from Arles
French film actresses
French television actresses
20th-century French actresses
21st-century French actresses
French stage actresses
Most Promising Actress Lumières Award winners